Send for Me is an LP album by Julie London, released by Liberty Records under catalog number LRP-3171 as a monophonic recording in 1961, and later in stereo under catalog number LST-7171 in 1961. Jimmy Rowles was the orchestra conductor.

Track listing

 Arrangements and Orchestra by Jimmy Rowles

References

External links

Liberty Records albums
1961 albums
Julie London albums